The 1965–66 season was the 93rd season of competitive football in Scotland and the 69th season of Scottish league football.

Overview
After the openness of recent years, the Old Firm came back strongly this season. Celtic won their first title under the management of Jock Stein, their first since 1954 and rivals Rangers finished as runners-up. For the only time in Scottish football, the Old Firm teams finished first and second in all three domestic competitions.

Scottish League Division One

Champions: Celtic
Relegated: Greenock Morton, Hamilton Academical

Scottish League Division Two

Promoted: Ayr United, Airdrieonians

Cup honours

Individual honours

Scottish clubs in Europe

Celtic

Dunfermline Athletic

Heart of Midlothian

Hibernian

Kilmarnock

Other honours

National

County

 – aggregate over two legs – play off – trophy shared

Highland League

Scotland national team

The Scottish national football side failed to qualify for the 1966 FIFA World Cup, which was ultimately won by the host nation England.

1966 British Home Championship – Third Place

Key:
(H) = Home match
(A) = Away match
WCQG8 = World Cup qualifying – Group 8
BHC = British Home Championship

Notes and references

External links
Scottish Football Historical Archive

 
Seasons in Scottish football